The Hunter Wheel was a device intended to improve the propulsion of steam-powered ships and evaluated in the middle 1840s. At the time, as ships were transitioning from sail to steam engine power, the understanding of the principles of hydrodynamics and efficient use of steam was in its infancy.

Concept 
The vertically mounted paddle wheel, at side or at the stern, was the first propulsion scheme used with steam power, but naval authorities were concerned about the vulnerability of the wheels to damage, whether in combat or peacetime use, and sought to increase the efficiency of ship designs, as the navies of the world began to switch from wooden hulls to iron ones. The only competition to wheel designs was John Ericsson's patent screw, which was just then entering its first trials on 

Lt. William W. Hunter and Benjamin Harris proposed a new wheel design, which consisted of a conventional paddle wheel drum placed horizontally within the vessel, below the water-line. The paddles were so arranged as to project from a suitable opening in the side of the ship, at right angles to the keel. Water was kept from entering by a cofferdam placed around the paddle wheel drum and against the side of the ship.

USS Union evaluation, 1843
It was discovered that Union’s  engines wasted too much energy uselessly driving the paddle wheels through the water-filled cofferdam inside the ship.

In USS Water Witch, 1845 

Revenue cutter George M. Bibb, 1845

Final evaluation on USS Allegheny, 1847
The Hunter design was also used in the construction of  but it was confirmed as being unreliable and inefficient, and Allegheny was later converted to screw propulsion. This appears to have been the last test of Hunter's wheel.

See also 

 Paddle steamer

References 

Marine propulsion
.